Clear Creek (Ínaam in Karuk) is a tributary of the upper Sacramento River in northern California.

Geography
Clear Creek is the first major Sacramento River tributary downstream of the Shasta Dam.

Clear Creek originates in the Trinity Mountains, between Shasta Lake and Trinity Lake in the Shasta-Trinity National Forest, and flows into Whiskeytown Lake reservoir, impounded by Whiskeytown Dam. Past the reservoir, the stream bed continues south until its confluence with the Sacramento River. The Spring Creek Tunnel bypasses that section and delivers water from Whiskeytown Lake directly to Keswick Reservoir, both part of the Central Valley Project.

History
The site along Clear Creek where Pierson B. Reading discovered gold in 1848 was declared a California Historical Landmark.

References

Rivers of Shasta County, California
Rivers of Siskiyou County, California
Tributaries of the Sacramento River
Trinity Mountains (California)
Central Valley Project
Shasta-Trinity National Forest
Rivers of Northern California